Carol Couchie, RM, is Nishnawbe Kwe and a registered midwife from Nipissing First Nation. She is a member of the first graduating class of Ryerson University's midwifery program in 1998. She is the first Indigenous woman to become a registered midwife in Ontario. She has previously served as chair of the Society of Obstetricians and Gynecologists of Canada's Aboriginal Health Issues Committee. She helped found the Association of Aboriginal Midwives and she helped establish the Aboriginal Midwifery Education Program at the University College of the North. She serves as co-lead of the National Aboriginal Council of Midwives (NACM). She currently practices as a member of K'Tigaaning Midwives, located at Nipissing First Nation.

Advocacy 
Couchie, in her role in federal advocacy organizations, has advocated for all federal political parties to support the regulation and provide sustainable funding for midwifery services in all provinces and territories. She has also promoted the benefits of integrating culturally appropriate health practices for Indigenous mothers and then need for equitable prenatal and postnatal support for Indigenous women and women in the remote north.

Select publications 
 

Mignon, Javier; Herrera, Jessica; Icú, Hugo; Couchie, Carol; Munro, Garry; Jiménez, Mélida; Chex, Rosa (2009). "Strengthening Indigenous and Intercultural Midwifery: Collaboration Between Guatemalan and Canadian Aboriginal Organizations." Pimatisiwin: A Journal of Aboriginal & Indigenous Community Health. 7(1): 133-155.

Couchie, Carol; Nabigon, Herbert (1997). “A Path Towards Reclaiming Nishnawbe Birth Culture: Can the Midwifery Exemption Clause for Aboriginal Midwives Make a Difference?,” in The New Midwifery: Reflections of Renaissance and Regulation, ed. Farah M. Shroff, (Toronto: Women’s Press, 1997), 41-50

Awards 

 Community Heroes in Health Award, Anishinabek Nation Health Conference (2018)
Alumni Achievement Awards, Ryerson University (2005)

References

External links 
 K'Tigaaning Midwives
 Interview of Carol Couchie by APTN National News

Canadian midwives
Living people
Year of birth missing (living people)
People from Nipissing District
Ojibwe people
Toronto Metropolitan University alumni